Gauge is an American post-hardcore band from the northwest suburbs of Chicago, Illinois.

History 
From the ashes of the bands Ivy League and Target, Gauge formed at the beginning of 1991. Highly regarded in Chicago's northwest suburban punk scene, they inspired and performed with other bands from the same area such as Cap'n Jazz, Friction, and Braid. Gauge released their first full-length, Soothe, by the end of 1992. After releasing their second album in 1994, entitled Fire Tongue Burning Stomach, they announced their break up.  A posthumous 10" was released in 1995, making the band's final recordings available.

During their career, Gauge played 150 shows. Their final show was on October 6, 1994, at The Moose Lodge in Mount Prospect, IL with Cap'n Jazz and Tetsuo.

Members of Gauge went on to perform in the bands Sky Corvair, Euphone, 5ive Style, Sweater Weather, Haymarket Riot, Traluma, Radio Flyer, Heroic Doses, Ambulette and Rollo Tomasi, as well as working with Joan Of Arc, Owls and Noyes.

Kevin J. Frank contributed vocals to the songs, "Geheim" and "Sergio Valente", which are tracks 12 and 13 on disc 2 of the Cap'n Jazz anthology album, Analphabetapolothology. These songs also appear on the Cap'n Jazz 7", Boys 16 to 18 Years... Age of Action (Further Beyond Records, 1993).

On December 8, 2009, it was announced Gauge will play live for the first time since 1994 on March 6, 2010, at the Bottom Lounge in Chicago, Illinois.

Following the 2010 reunion shows, a documentary/tribute/concert film entitled "GAUGE:153" was shot and edited by filmmaker Matt Golin. The film features 9 live songs from their 2010 reunion shows intercut with historical footage of the band and interviews with members of Cap'n Jazz, Braid, and Sidekick Kato among others.

Discography

Gauge Releases

Compilations
Split 7" w/ Grout Villa (Permanent Satan, 1992)
Achtung Chicago! Zwei! (Underdog Records, 1993)
It's A Punk Thing, You Wouldn't Understand (Shakefork Records, 1993)
A Very Punk Christmas (The Rocco Empire & Further Beyond Records, 1993)

References

External links
Official Website
Myspace

American post-hardcore musical groups